Rowing at the Friendship Games took place at the Man-made Basin, located within the Trade Unions Olympic Sports Centre in Moscow, Soviet Union between 24 and 26 August 1984. 14 events (8 men's and 6 women's) were contested.

Medal summary

Men's events

Women's events

* – only two teams competed

Medal table

See also
 Rowing at the 1984 Summer Olympics

References

Friendship Games
Friendship Games
1984 in Soviet sport
Friendship Games
Rowing in Europe
Rowing in the Soviet Union